Harold Morrow (born February 24, 1973) is a former National Football League fullback for the Minnesota Vikings, the Baltimore Ravens, and the Arizona Cardinals.

External links
ESPN Player Profile

1973 births
Living people
People from Chilton County, Alabama
Players of American football from Alabama
American football running backs
Auburn Tigers football players
Minnesota Vikings players
Baltimore Ravens players
Arizona Cardinals players